Rich versus Roach is a 1959 studio album by drummers Buddy Rich and Max Roach with their respective bands of the time. The album is mixed with each of the two bands in a different stereo channel.

Track listing
LP side A
"Sing, Sing, Sing (With a Swing)" (Louis Prima) – 4:06
"The Casbah" (Gigi Gryce) – 4:25
"Sleep" (Earl Burtnett, Adam Geibel) – 3:15
"Figure Eights" (Buddy Rich, Max Roach) – 4:26
LP side B
"Yesterdays" (Otto Harbach, Jerome Kern) – 4:15
"Big Foot" (Charlie Parker) – 4:59
"Limehouse Blues" (Philip Braham, Douglas Furber) – 3:42
"Toot, Toot, Tootsie, Goodbye" (Ernie Erdman, Ted Fio Rito, Gus Kahn, Robert A. K. King) – 3:50

1986 CD re-issue with alternate versions:
"Sing, Sing, Sing (With a Swing)" (alt. take) – 4:22
"Sing, Sing, Sing (With a Swing)" – 4:08
"The Casbah" – 4:28
"The Casbah" (alt. take) – 4:58
"Sleep" – 3:18
"Figure Eights" – 4:30
"Yesterdays" – 5:41
"Big Foot" – 5:00
"Big Foot" (alt. take) – 5:14
"Limehouse Blues" – 3:56
"Limehouse Blues" (alt. take) – 3:43
"Toot, Toot, Tootsie, Goodbye" – 3:57

Personnel 
Rich's band
 Buddy Rich – drums, percussion
Phil Woods – alto saxophone
Willie Dennis – trombone
Phil Leshin – double bass
John Bunch – piano

Roach's band
 Max Roach – drums
Stanley Turrentine – tenor saxophone
Julian Priester – trombone
Tommy Turrentine – trumpet
Bobby Boswell – double bass

Production
 Jack Tracy – producer, liner notes
 Gigi Gryce – arranger
 Bill Stoddard – engineer
 Kiyoshi "Boxman" Koyama – compilation, research

References 

Mercury MG-20448 (original LP)
Mercury 826987-2 (CD)

Buddy Rich albums
Max Roach albums
Mercury Records albums
1959 albums
Collaborative albums